King Dongcheon of Goguryeo (209–248, r. 227–248) was the 11th monarch of Goguryeo, the northernmost of the Three Kingdoms of Korea.

Family
Father: King Sansang (산상왕, 山上王)
Grandfather: King Sindae (신대왕, 新大王)
Mother: Little Consort (소후, 小后)
Consorts and their respective issue(s):
Unknown queen
Prince Yeonbul (연불, 然弗)
Prince Yemul (예물, 預物; d. 248)
Prince Sagu (사구, 奢句; d. 248)
Unknown concubine; the people of the East Sea offer a beautiful woman to the king

Background
He was the grandson of Goguryeo's eighth ruler, Sindae and the son of the tenth ruler, Sansang. His mother was King Sansang's royal concubine, from the Jutong-chon of Gwanno-bu. He was made crown prince in 213, and rose to the throne upon Sansang's death.

Reign
In 238, Dongcheon was able to ally with the Wei, one of the three Chinese kingdoms in northernwest area, in order to destroy the Gongsun family and erase its influence over Liaodong Peninsula and other areas bordering Goguryeo. The war on the Gongsun was a victory, but Goguryeo's ally, Wei, eventually became a new threat.

Goguryeo consolidated its power and began to threaten the Chinese commanderies, under the nominal control of Wei. In 242, Dongcheon attacked a Chinese fortress near the mouth of the Yalu River leading to the Goguryeo–Wei War; in 244, Wei invaded Goguryeo and sacked Hwando. Dongcheon was forced to flee the capital. Staying in Okjeo, his forces managed to return long-standing capital of which structures were severely destroyed only to move its capital to current Pyeongyang in 246. The exact location of the new capital has been still disputed.

Then, according to the  Korean book, the Samguk Sagi, a Goguryeo general named Yu Yu (유유, 紐由) approached the Wei encampment and fooled the Wei commanders into thinking that Goguryeo had come to surrender. Yu Yu took this chance to murder an officer and then committed suicide, causing great confusion and discord in the Wei army. King Dongcheon received news of Yu Yu's death and ordered that a memorial be made for Yu Yu the Patriot. Then, he led his armies in the attack to push the Wei forces out of Goguryeo territory. General Mil U (밀우, 密友) and Yu Okgu (유옥구, 劉屋句) also repulsed the Wei forces. The Goguryeo forces won this battle, and regained all of the territory that had been lost from defeats against the Wei. This passage was not paralleled in Chinese records, and Hiroshi Ikeuchi points out its errors: the author of this passage in Samguk Sagi regarded the region of South Okjeo and Lelang as identical, while in fact they are on opposite sides of the peninsula; also, the references to the "Eastern Department" for Yu Yu and Mil U are anachronistic, since Goguryeo did not divide the country into departments until the middle of the Goguryeo dynasty — that is, after Dongcheon's reign. As such, Ikeuchi considered the Samguk Sagi'''s stories to be highly fictional.

In 243, he named his son Yeonbul the crown prince and successor to the throne. He attacked Silla, another of the Three Kingdoms to its south, in 245 but made peace in 248. The records are found in Samguk Sagi under the annal of Isageum (Silla’s ruler) that Dongcheon invaded northern area of Silla but the validity of peace agreement has not been fully explained given that Goguryeo was under harsh attacks from the northern area, henceforth invasion of Goguryeo into Silla would be logically incomprehensible. It is well accepted that this invasion indicated sudden inflow of refugees from Goguryeo into bordering area with Silla.

Death and succession
Dongcheon fell ill and died during the fall of 248 after 22 years of rule. His tomb is said to be in South Pyongan Province near Pyongyang, North Korea. He is said to have been so loved that many people followed him in death. Crown Prince Yeon-Bul succeeded his father as King Jungcheon immediately after his father's death.

See also
History of Korea
Three Kingdoms of Korea
List of Korean monarchs
Goguryeo–Wei Wars

Notes

References
Hubert, Homer B. & Weems, Clarence Norwood (Ed.) History of Korea Volume 1. Curzon Press, 1999. .
Ikeuchi, Hiroshi. "The Chinese Expeditions to Manchuria under the Wei dynasty," Memoirs of the Research Department of the Toyo Bunko'' 4 (1929): 71-119.

Goguryeo rulers
209 births
248 deaths
3rd-century monarchs in Asia
3rd-century Korean people